Robin Wayne Carrell (born 5 April 1936) is a New Zealand-born haematologist.

Born in 1936, Carrell was educated at Christchurch Boys' High School from 1949 to 1953. He graduated MB ChB from the University of Otago in 1959, and BSc(Hons) in chemistry and biochemistry from the University of Canterbury and Lincoln College in 1965. He completed his PhD at the University of Cambridge in 1967 and in 1968 he was appointed head of clinical biochemistry at Christchurch Hospital, the department later becoming part of the University of Otago Christchurch School of Medicine. As a spin-off from his research he co-founded biotechnology company Canterbury Scientific in 1985. He returned to Cambridge the following year as professor of haematology, retiring in 2003, but as professor emeritus he has continued his research at Cambridge. He retired from the board of directors of Canterbury Scientific in 2012.

In 1986 he won the Hector Medal, at the time the highest award in New Zealand science. He was elected a Fellow of the Royal Society of New Zealand in 1980, a Fellow of Trinity College, Cambridge in 1987, and a Fellow of the Royal Society in 2002.

References

1936 births
Living people
People educated at Christchurch Boys' High School
University of Otago alumni
University of Canterbury alumni
Lincoln University (New Zealand) alumni
Hematologists
Academic staff of the University of Otago
New Zealand Fellows of the Royal Society
Fellows of Trinity College, Cambridge
Fellows of the Royal Society of New Zealand
New Zealand medical researchers
English medical researchers
20th-century New Zealand scientists